Sir Hector Busby  (1 August 1932 – 11 May 2019), also known as Heke-nuku-mai-nga-iwi Puhipi and Hec Busby, was a New Zealand Māori navigator and traditional waka builder. He was recognised as a leading figure in the revival of traditional Polynesian navigation and ocean voyaging using wayfinding techniques.

He built 26 traditional waka, including the double-hulled Te Aurere which has sailed over 30,000 nautical miles in the Pacific including Hawaii, Cook Islands, French Polynesia, New Caledonia and Norfolk Island. In December 2012, Te Aurere and Ngahiraka Mai Tawhiti (another waka built by Busby) reached Rapa Nui after a 5000-nautical-mile, four-month voyage from New Zealand. The two waka then made the return journey to New Zealand, landing at Aurere Beach in Doubtless Bay in May 2013.

Honours
Busby received the New Zealand Commemoration Medal in 1990. In the 1994 Queen's Birthday Honours, he was appointed a Member of the Order of the British Empire, for services to the Māori people. In the 2014 New Year Honours, Busby was named an Officer of the New Zealand Order of Merit, for services to Māori. He was promoted to Knight Companion, for services to Māori, in the 2018 Queen's Birthday Honours.

Personal life 
Busby was of mixed Pākehā and Māori heritage. He was from the Māori tribes of Te Rarawa and Ngāti Kahu.

Busby died on 11 May 2019.

See also
Hōkūleʻa
Nainoa Thompson

References

External links
 Sir Hekenukumai Busby discussed in Sir Hekenukumai Busby, 1932–2019, Morning Report on Radio New Zealand 13 May 2019
 Sir Hekenukumai Busby interviewed and his work discussed in Ocean Voyaging, Te Ahi Kaa on Radio New Zealand 10 February 2019
Sir Hek Busby: 'He was the bridge builder of Oceania', interview with Toby Mills about his film on Busby, Sunday Morning on RNZ 14 November 2021

1932 births
2019 deaths
Polynesian navigators
New Zealand Māori carvers
New Zealand engineers
Ngāti Kahu people
Te Rarawa people
New Zealand Members of the Order of the British Empire
Knights Companion of the New Zealand Order of Merit